Emucarididae is an extinct family of soft-shelled trilobite-like arthropods (nektaspids) from the Lower Cambrian of South Australia and South China. It contains only two genera – Emucaris and Kangacaris. Two species were described in 2010 from specimens recovered from Emu Bay Shale Lagerstätte, one species in 2012 from the Maotianshan Shales. It is classified under the order Nektaspida, and is a sister-group to the families Liwiidae and Naraoiidae.

Description 
The Emucarididae have a non-calcified exoskeleton that consists of an articulating head shield (or cephalon), thorax and tail shield (or pygidium), and there are no constrictions where these parts meet. The cephalon is semi-circular and has a straight back margin. The thorax consists of 3 or 4 narrow segments. The pygidium is 1-2× as long as the cephalon and has a distinct border furrow. The mouth plate (or hypostome) that sits on the belly-side of the cephalon is elongated and divided by a straight left-to-right suture. The frontal portion is approximately square with two pointed horns that extend from the frontal margin to the sides (like in a capital T), the back portion is longer than wide with a round back margin. The pair of relatively short antennas  are implanted behind the horns of the hypostome and stick out to the sides. There appear to be three pairs of limbs under the cephalon, carrying side branches with bristle-like gills (or setae).

References 

Nektaspida
Cambrian first appearances
Cambrian extinctions
Trilobite families